The Kampala Flyover Road Project, also Kampala Flyover Project, is a road-improvement project in the Central Division of Kampala, the capital city of Uganda and the largest city in that East African country.

Location
The project involves the construction of flyovers at the "Clock Tower", and at "Kitgum House", the widening of Nsambya Road and of Mukwano Road, including the improvements of interfacing roads and junctions. The project stretches over an estimated .

Overview
This road project is intended to decongest the city by separating through-traffic from the city-street-traffic. This project focuses on traffic entering the city, mainly from Entebbe along the old Kampala-Entebbe Road and from Mpigi, along the Kampala-Mpigi Expressway. Traffic from these routes, destined to Lugogo, Nakawa and points along the Kampala-Jinja Highway will find this new route faster and more user-friendly, reducing travel times and leading to less carbon emissions from exhaust fumes in stalled traffic on the city streets. Also, by removing the pass-through traffic, off the city streets, the congestion will be lessened.

Background
In an attempt to reduce gridlock within the city of Kampala, the Japan International Cooperation Agency (JICA) commissioned a study in 2010 which was updated in 2013 and 2014 to examine available options for alleviating chronic traffic jams in the Greater Kampala Metropolitan Area.

The Government of Uganda accepted the recommendation of the study and through the Uganda National Roads Authority (UNRA), engaged Nippon Koei in a joint venture with Eighth Japan Engineering Company (EJEC) and Infra Consulting Services Limited (ICS) to carry out the detailed design and tender assistance of the Kampala Flyover Project. The project (Jinja Road – Mukwano Road – Queen's Way) is funded by the Ugandan government, with financing from JICA.

Construction
The first phase of this project is expected to begin in 2018, once a contractor has been selected. The work is budgeted at US$148 to US$200 million (depending on sources), borrowed from the Government of Japan, through the Japan International Cooperation Agency.

On 19 December 2018, construction of this project was flagged off by Yoweri Museveni, Uganda's president. The first phase is budgeted at USh300 billion (US$82 million).

See also
 List of roads in Uganda
 Transport in Uganda

References

External links
Flyover won’t decongest Kampala city

Roads in Uganda
Transport in Kampala
Road infrastructure in Uganda
Transport infrastructure in Africa
Transport infrastructure in Uganda